I'm Alone was a Canadian ship used as a rum runner during Prohibition in the United States. The auxiliary schooner was built in Lunenburg Nova Scotia in 1923 (hull # 126), and for six years, she transported contraband alcohol. Another source says the ship was built in the United Kingdom. Her registry was in Lunenburg, Nova Scotia. Seven of the ship's eight crew members were rescued. The eighth, a French Canadian boatswain, Leon Mainguy, died. The surviving crew members, including captain John "Jack" Randell, were arrested and jailed in New Orleans.

The sinking caused tensions in Canadian–American relations, with Envoy Vincent Massey criticizing the Americans' actions. The Canadian government sued for damages. Coast Guard intelligence personnel, led by Elizebeth Friedman, were able to demonstrate in international arbitration that the owners of I'm Alone were Americans, despite the ship's Canadian registry. As a result, the U.S. paid a fine much lower than the amount initially requested by Canada. Captain Randell and Amanda Mainguy, the widow of the crew member who died, both received restitution. The widow of dead sailor received $16,000 whilst Captain Randall received $7,000. The owners of the I'm Alone received no restitution.

The incident was described in song by Canadian poet/folk musician Wade Hemsworth, "The Sinking of the I'm Alone".

References

Further reading

"The Sinking of The I'm Alone", also containing biographical information about Jack Randell

1923 ships
1929 in Canada
Individual sailing vessels
Maritime history of Canada
Maritime incidents in 1929
Ships built in Nova Scotia
Shipwrecks of the Louisiana coast